Spase Tous Deiktes (Greek: Σπάσε Τους Δείκτες; English: Break The Markers) is the twentieth studio album by popular Greek artist, Katy Garbi.

It was released on 19 December 2017 by Panik Platinum, marking Garbi's first album release with the Panik label, and received gold certification, selling over 6,000 units. The album is a continuation of the modern laika with pop genre since the previous platinum release Perierges Meres, four years prior. The album also reintroduces Katy to the dance genre for the first time since 2005, comprising two dance tracks, "Kardia Alitissa" and "Kaneis San Esena". The album was produced by Leonidas Tzitzos, who worked with Garbi on nine tracks on Perierges Meres. Composing credits include new and past collaborators including Giorgos Sabanis, Ilias Kabakakis, Dimitris Kontopoulos, Kostas Miliotakis, Thanos Georgoulas, Giannis Fraseris, Iordanis Pavlou, Gavriil Gavriiloglou and Makis Berdes.

The album's release coincided with Garbi's live performances at the clubs Stage in Thessaloniki, and Iera Odos in Athens, alongside Vasilis Karras and Christos Menidiatis. The album featured two tracks penned by Karras, one of which was recorded as a duet titled "Oute Lexi".

While the album was being recorded, Garbi released three singles that were not included in the album. The first not-included single was "Eleftheri" (music: Georgina Karahaliou & JP, lyrics: Niki Papatheohari) which was released on 24 April 2015, the second was "Tin Kardia Sou Rota" (music: Thanos Georgoulas, lyrics: Natalia Germanou) which was released only in Turkey on 21 December 2015, and the third was "Savvatovrado" (music: Marios Psimopoulos, lyrics: Eleni Giannatsoulia) which was released on 9 July 2016.

Singles
Spase Tous Deiktes produced four singles prior its release.

"Koita S' Agapao"

The album's first single was "Koita S' Agapao" (music: Thanos Georgoulas, lyrics: Natalia Germanou), which was released in two versions. The tracks were produced in Greece, Turkey and England. The album version was released as a teaser via Garbi's official YouTube channel on 30 November 2015. The single was officially released via iTunes on 14 December 2015. It featured only Garbi's vocals, recorded at Bi-Kay studio (Greece), the music in Turkey and the mixing and mastering in London, at La Boutique Studio by well-known producer Matteo Cifelli. The music video for the track aired on 28 December 2015 via Garbi's official YouTube channel. It was directed by Garbi's long time visual collaborator, Victoria Vellopoulou. The video was filmed on the island of Mykonos, Greece and is the first Garbi video directed by Vellopoulou to feature Garbi singing the lyrics unlike previous works. It features Turkish singer Burak Kut as the love interest, whose vocals are featured on the second version. The second version has Greek and Turkish lyrics performed by Garbi and Kut respectively (music: Thanos Giorgoulas, Greek lyrics: Natalia Germanou, Turkish lyrics: Burak Kut). The track was made available on 15 December 2015 and a corresponding video was released on 01 February 2016 directed by Victoria Vellopoulou from the same shoot as its predecessor. Both recordings feature 22 Turkish violins in the composition. The song gained much radio airplay and signaled Garbi's album return.

"Avrio"

The album's second single was "Avrio" (music: Giorgos Sabanis, lyrics: Nikos Gritsis). On 17 October 2016 the Panik Platinum leaked a short teaser of the track on YouTube which was picked up by several radio stations across Greece. The single was officially released on 31 October 2016 and gained much radio airplay. The music video was released on 24 February 2017 and directed by Victoria Vellopoulou, and was based on a timeline in three different global locations over three dates. It featured international model, Paraskevas Bourbourakas, as Garbi's love interest and actress, Miriella Kourenti, as Garbi's past self.

"Kaneis San Esena"

The third single, "Kaneis San Esena" (music: Iordanis Pavlou, lyrics: Aggeliki Makrinioti), is a dance track and marks Garbi's first return to the genre since 2005. The single was first showcased on 2 April 2017 on ANT1 Greek talent show Rising Star. Garbi was an invited guest of Despina Vandi, also performing other songs live with the two remaining 'Team Vandi' contestants. The track was officially released by Panik Platinum on 5 April 2017. The track gained much radio airplay throughout the summer and was remixed by DeeHayParis & Harris V. and released on 7 June 2017.

"Vale Mia Teleia"

The album's fourth single, "Vale Mia Teleia" (music: Gavriil Gavriiloglou, lyrics: Vasilis Karras), was released on 10 November 2017. The digital release also includes an acoustic version. The single was released in the form of a music video directed by Victoria Vellopoulou on the same day of its digital release. The music video features Garbi in a montage of photoshoots, of which one of the noticeable backdrops is the artwork from Garbi's 2001 album Apla Ta Pragmata. The song received much radio airplay. The single which featured the backing vocals of Vasilis Karras acted as a promotional piece for Garbi's scheduled performances with Vasilis Karras and Christos Menidiatis at 'Stage', Thessaloniki which commenced on 24 November 2017.

"Spase Tous Deiktes Tou Rologiou"

The title track "Spase Tous Deiktes Tou Rologiou" was the album's fifth single. It was released to radio airplay on 5 February 2018 and on Youtube the day of the album's official release. The track was written by both writers (music: Giorgos Sabanis, lyrics: Eleni Giannatsoulia) involved in the production of well received track "Anemodarmena Ipsi", and subsequently samples a segment of the song before the first chorus.

"San Tsigaro"

The sixth single from the album was "San Tsigaro" (music: Kostas Miliotakis, lyrics: Smaroula Maragkoudaki). It was announced by Panik Platinum on 2 May 2018 and gained much airplay.

"Mia Kiria"

The seventh and last single from the album was "Mia Kiria" (music: Giannis Fraseris, lyrics: Vaggelis Konstantinidis). It was announced by Panik Platinum on 1 October 2018 and received much airplay.

Track listing

Credits 

Personnel
Christos Bousdoukos: violin (tracks: 2, 4)
Panagiotis Brakoulias: guitars, oud (tracks: 15)
Victoria Chalkiti: backing vocals (tracks: 14)
Akis Diximos: backing vocals (tracks: 3, 5, 7, 12, 14) || second vocal (tracks: 10)
Giannis Fraseris: backing vocals (tracks: 4, 11)
Gavriil Gavriiloglou: second vocal (tracks: 6)
Thanos Georgoulas: keyboards, orchestration, programming (tracks: 13)
Kostas Gontikakis: Cretan lyre (tracks: 5)
Giannis Grigoriou: bass (tracks: 1, 4, 6, 8, 10, 11)
Gündem Yaylı Grubu: strings (tracks: 13)
Giorgos Kostoglou: bass (tracks: 13)
Apostolis Mallias: clarinet (tracks: 6, 8, 11) || duduk (tracks: 3) || ney (tracks: 3, 6, 8, 11)
Marios Mourmouras: guitars (tracks: 13)
Andreas Mouzakis: drums (tracks: 1, 4, 6, 8, 10, 11, 13)
Stavros Papagiannakopoulos: baglama (tracks: 4) || cümbüş (tracks: 7, 9) || mandolin (tracks: 10) || oud (tracks: 1) || säz (tracks: 1, 4, 6, 7)
Giorgos Retikas: guitars (tracks: 11, 12)
Leonidas Tzitzos: keyboards, orchestration, programming (tracks: 1, 2, 3, 4, 5, 6, 7, 8, 9, 10, 11, 12, 14, 15)
Panagiotis Vounatsos: guitars (tracks: 3, 8)
Fivos Zacharopoulos: guitars (tracks: 1, 2, 4, 6, 7, 9, 10)

 Production 

Kiriakos Asteriou (Bi-Kay studio): mix engineer (tracks: 1, 2, 3, 4, 5, 6, 7, 8, 9, 10, 11, 12, 14) || sound engineer (tracks: 1, 2, 3, 4, 5, 6, 7, 8, 9, 10, 11, 12, 13, 14)
Babis Biris (Bi-Kay studio): mastering (tracks: 1, 2, 3, 4, 5, 6, 7, 9, 10, 11, 12, 14, 15)
Vasilis Bouloubasis: hair styling
Panagiotis Brakoulias (Track Factory Recording studio): mix engineer, sound engineer (tracks: 15)
Matteo Cifelli (La Boutique studio): mastering, mix engineer (tracks: 13)
Giannis Gkiouras (New Sound studio): editing, mastering (tracks: 8)
Christina Kazagli: artwork
Vaggelis Kiris: photographer
Dionisis Kolpodinos: styling
Leonidas Tzitzos: production manager
Manos Vynichakis: make up

Chart performance 
Spase Tous Deiktes debuted on the IFPI Top 75 Albums chart at number 23. The album climbed to 16th position and remained on the charts for 14 weeks, before falling out of the Top 75 and re-entering for a further three weeks climbing to 38th position, one year after its initial release.

Awards
Spase Tous Deiktes received multiple award nominations in 2018 at the MAD Video Music Awards (Greece) and the Super Music Awards (Cyprus), resulting in no wins.

References

External links
Official website

Katy Garbi albums
2017 albums
Panik Records albums